Chris Saunders (born March 11, 1986) is an American mixed martial artist. He competes in the lightweight division.

Mixed martial arts record

|-
| Win
| align=center| 16–8
| Derion Chapman
| Decision (unanimous)
| CXF 7 - Locked and Loaded
| 
| align=center| 3
| align=center| 5:00
| Los Angeles, United States
| 
|-
| Loss
| align=center| 15–8
| Chris Culley
| Decision (split)
| BAMMA Badbeat 20 - Saunders vs. Culley
| 
| align=center| 5
| align=center| 5:00
| Commerce, California, United States
| 
|-
| Win
| align=center| 15–7
| Darren Smith Jr.
| Decision (unanimous)
| WSOF 28 - Moraes vs. Barajas
| 
| align=center| 3
| align=center| 5:00
| Garden Grove, California, United States
| 

|-
| Win
| align=center| 14–7
| Kevin Bostick
| Submission (guillotine choke)
| BAMMA USA: Badbeat 17
| 
| align=center| 1
| align=center| 0:29
| Commerce, California, United States
| 
|-
| Win
| align=center| 13–7
| Brandon Morris
| Submission (guillotine choke)
| BAMMA USA: Badbeat 16
| 
| align=center| 2
| align=center| 1:28
| Commerce, California, United States
| 
|-
| Win
| align=center| 12–7
| Darren Smith
| Submission (guillotine choke)
| BAMMA USA: Badbeat 15
| 
| align=center| 1
| align=center| 1:14
| Commerce, California, United States
| 
|-
| Loss
| align=center| 11–7
| Dominic Clark
| Submission (guillotine choke)
| LOP: Chaos at the Casino 5
| 
| align=center| 1
| align=center| 1:09
| Inglewood, California, United States
| 
|-
| Win
| align=center| 11–6
| Dominic Gutierrez
| Submission (guillotine choke)
| LOP: Chaos at the Casino 4
| 
| align=center| 3
| align=center| 1:03
| Inglewood, California, United States
| 
|-
| Loss
| align=center| 10–6
| Sevak Magakian
| Decision (unanimous)
| LOP: Chaos at the Casino 3
| 
| align=center| 3
| align=center| 3:00
| Inglewood, California, United States
| 
|-
| Win
| align=center| 10–5
| Shad Smith
| Submission (triangle choke)
| RITC: Respect in the Cage
| 
| align=center| 2
| align=center| 1:10
| Pomona, California, United States
| 
|-
| Loss
| align=center| 9–5
| Akop Stepanyan
| TKO (kick to the body and punches)
| Bellator XCII
| 
| align=center| 3
| align=center| 3:55
| Temecula, California, United States
| 
|-
| Loss
| align=center| 9–4
| Thiago Meller
| Decision (unanimous)
| Samurai Pro Sports: Samurai MMA Pro 4
| 
| align=center| 3
| align=center| 5:00
| Culver City, California, United States
| 
|-
| Loss
| align=center| 9–3
| Myles Jury
| Submission (guillotine choke)
| The Ultimate Fighter: Live Finale
| 
| align=center| 1
| align=center| 4:03
| Las Vegas, Nevada, United States
| 
|-
| Loss
| align=center| 9–2
| Chris Horodecki
| Decision (unanimous)
| Bellator XLVII
| 
| align=center| 3
| align=center| 5:00
| Rama, Ontario, Canada
| 
|-
| Win
| align=center| 9–1
| Cleber Luciano
| KO (punches)
| IFS 7: New Blood
| 
| align=center| 2
| align=center| 0:22
| Pico Rivera, California, United States
| 
|-
| Win
| align=center| 8–1
| George Valdez
| TKO (elbow and punches)
| MEZ Sports: Pandemonium 3
| 
| align=center| 4
| align=center| 3:21
| Los Angeles, California, United States
| 
|-
| Win
| align=center| 7–1
| Andy Morales
| Decision (unanimous)
| BITB: Battle in the Ballroom
| 
| align=center| 3
| align=center| 5:00
| Irvine, California, United States
| 
|-
| Win
| align=center| 6–1
| Todd Willingham
| Decision (unanimous)
| BITB: Battle in the Ballroom
| 
| align=center| 3
| align=center| 5:00
| Irvine, California, United States
| 
|-
| Win
| align=center| 5–1
| Nick Reale
| Submission (guillotine choke)
| LBFN 8: Long Beach Fight Night 8
| 
| align=center| 1
| align=center| 1:35
| Long Beach, California, United States
| 
|-
| Win
| align=center| 4–1
| Billy Terry
| TKO (punches)
| BITB: Battle in the Ballroom
| 
| align=center| 2
| align=center| 1:48
| Irvine, California, United States
| 
|-
| Win
| align=center| 3–1
| Todd Willingham
| Decision (unanimous)
| BITB: Battle in the Ballroom
| 
| align=center| 3
| align=center| 3:00
| Irvine, California, United States
| 
|-
| Loss
| align=center| 2–1
| Isaac Gutierrez
| Submission (rear-naked choke)
| SP: Conquest in the Cage 5
| 
| align=center| 2
| align=center| 0:18
| Montebello, California, United States
| 
|-
| Win
| align=center| 2–0
| Guilherme Cotliarenko
| Decision (unanimous)
| Battle in the Ballroom: SummerFist 3
| 
| align=center| 3
| align=center| 5:00
| Irvine, California, United States
| 
|-
| Win
| align=center| 1–0
| Thor Skancke
| Submission (guillotine choke)
| Battle in the Ballroom: Summer Fist 3
| 
| align=center| 2
| align=center| 2:47
| Costa Mesa, California, United States
|

See also
List of male mixed martial artists

References

External links
 
 

1986 births
American male mixed martial artists
Lightweight mixed martial artists
Living people